The Grammy Trustees Award is awarded by  The Recording Academy to "individuals who, during their careers in music, technology, and so on have made significant contributions, other than performance, to the field of recording". From  1983 onwards, performers could also receive this award. This award is distinct from the Grammy Lifetime Achievement Award, which honors performers.

Trustees Award recipients
The following individuals have received Trustees Awards, listed by year.

References

External links
 Official website

Trustees Award